Cees de Wolf (17 December 1945 – 21 July 2011) was a Dutch professional footballer who played as a left winger.

Career
De Wolf was born in Purmerend. He played in the Netherlands for Ajax, Haarlem and Blauw-Wit, and in Belgium for KV Mechelen. He also played in the North American Soccer League for the Dallas Tornado.

References

1945 births
2011 deaths
People from Purmerend
Dutch footballers
Footballers from North Holland
Association football wingers
Eredivisie players
Belgian Pro League players
AFC Ajax players
De Wold, Cees
North American Soccer League (1968–1984) players
HFC Haarlem players
K.V. Mechelen players
Blauw-Wit Amsterdam players
Dutch expatriate footballers
Dutch expatriate sportspeople in the United States
Expatriate soccer players in the United States
Dutch expatriate sportspeople in Belgium
Expatriate footballers in Belgium